L'Artisan Parfumeur is a French niche perfume house owned by Puig company from Spain, which also owns British perfume house Penhaligon's.

History
L’Artisan Parfumeur was established in 1976 by Jean Laporte. In 1982, he left the company, going on to form rival Maître Parfumeur et Gantier in 1988.

L'Artisan is based in Paris—the original store opened on Rue de Grenelle in 1979—but now has outlets worldwide.

L’Artisan’s 2012 release Seville à l’aube was the subject of the book The Perfume Lover, a memoir by Denyse Beaulieu describing her collaboration with French perfumer Bertrand Duchaufour to develop the scent. Together they went through more than 100 modifications to develop the fragrance with notes of orange blossom, incense, smoke, beeswax, flowers and musk.

In January 2015, private equity firm Fox Paine & Company, then L’Artisan’s owner, sold the company to the Spanish perfume group Puig (along with British perfume line Penhaligon's).

Products

It specialises in unusual fragrances, working with master perfumers such as Michel Almairac, Evelyne Boulanger, Bertrand Duchaufour, Jean-Claude Ellena, Dora Baghriche-Arnaud, Elisabeth Maier, Karine Vinchon, Fabrice Pellegrin, Olivia Giacobetti, and Anne Flipo. The emphasis is on scents from nature.

The company sells candles and home fragrances as well as fragrances.

Perfumes
Fragrances (with date of release):

2020
 Couleur Vanille 
2016
 Bucoliques de Provence
2014
 Haute Voltige
 Rappelle-Toi
 Onde Sensuelle
2013
 Caligna eau de parfum
 Amour Nocturne
 Deliria
 Skin on Skin
2012
 Séville à L'Aube
2011
 Fleur d'Oranger 2011
 Mon Numero series (1, 3, 4, 6, 7, 8, 9, and 10) 
 Batucada
2010
 Nuit de Tubéreuse
 Coeur de Vetiver Sacré
 Traversée du Bosphore
2009
 Côte d'Amour
 Vanille Absolument (first called Havana Vanille)
 Al Oudh
2008
 Fleur de Liane
 Aedes de Venustas
 Mûre et Musc Extrait
2007
 L'Eau de Jatamansi
 Iris Pallida 2007
 Fleur d'Oranger 2007
 L'Echange
2006
 Dzongkha
 Fleur de Narcisse 2006
 Fou d'Absinthe
 Mandarine Tout Simplement
 L'Été en Douce
2005
 La Chasse aux Papillons Extrême
 Extrait de Songes
 Ambroisie Ararat
 Fleur d'Oranger 2005
2004
 Ananas Fizz
 Jour de Fête
 Timbuktu
 Eau de Printemps
2003
 Bois Farine
 Premier Figuier Extrême
 Un Zeste D'Été
2002
 Safran Troublant
 Poivre Piquant
 Piment Brûlant
 Patchouli Patch
2001
 Ambre Extrême
 Framboise Tralala
 Une Bouquet en Mai
 Thé des Sables
2000
 Tea for Two
 Jacinthe des Bois
 Oeillet Sauvage
 Verte Violette
 Fleur de Carotte
1999
 Passage d'Enfer
 La Chasse aux Papillons
 Dzing!
1998
 Navegar
 Sautes d'Humeur: A Rire
 Sautes d'Humeur: Reveuse
 Sautes d'Humeur: A Rien
 Sautes d'Humeur: Jalouse
 Sautes d'Humeur: Massacrante
1997
 Méchant Loup
 L'Eau du Floriste
1996
 Thé Pour un Été
 Drôle de Rose
1994
 Premier Figuier
1993
 Voleur de Roses
 Mûre et Musc Extrême
 L'Eau de L'Artisan
1992
 Mimosa Pour Moi
1990
 Riviéra Palace
1989
 Alchimie Pourpre
 Eau des Merveilleuses
1985
 Orchidée Blanc
 L'Eau du Caporal
1984
 Bouton d'Or
1982
 La Haie Fleurie du Hameau
 Les Hesperédés de la Grande Sierre
1979
 Patchouli
 L'Eau du Navigateur
1978
 Vetiver
 Vanilia
 Tubéreuse
 Santal
 Mûre et Musc
 L'Eau d'Ambre

Some of these fragrances are no longer in production.

Limited editions
Beginning in 2005, L'Artisan has issued a limited edition "grand cru" soliflore perfume each year from a specific harvest of a particular flower. The creator of the fragrances is master "nose" Anne Flipo. Production is limited to a few thousand bottles each. The price is considerably higher ($250–$295 per 3.4 ounce bottle) and the packaging more elaborate than for the regular fragrances. These include:

 Fleur d'Oranger 2005 (Orange blossom harvest of April 2004 from Nabeul, Tunisia)
 Fleur de Narcisse 2006 (Narcissus harvest of June 6–7, 2005 from Lozère, France)
 Iris Pallida 2007 (Tuscan iris harvest of 2001). Iris scent molecules take three years to form in the roots (rhizomes) of the iris plant. These roots are dried, ground into colloidal powder, and treated with alcohol to make orris butter, the precious pure absolute of the Iris pallida plant. It takes 41 tons of iris root to produce one kilogram of rhizomal extract.
 Fleur d'Oranger 2007 (Orange blossom harvest of April 2006 from Nabeul, Tunisia)

References

External links

Puig
Perfume houses
Design companies established in 1976
French companies established in 1976
Companies based in Paris
Privately held companies of France
Cosmetics companies of France
Niche perfumes